The 2022 heat wave in India and Pakistan is an extreme weather event which has resulted in the hottest March in the subcontinent since 1901. The hot season arrived unusually early in the year and extended into April, affecting a large part of India's northwest and Pakistan. The heatwave has combined with a drought, with rainfall being only a quarter to a third of normal.  The heat wave is remarkable for occurring during a La Niña event.

Pakistan's Minister of Climate Change Sherry Rehman described it as a "spring-less year". As of 9 May, at least 90 people have died; 25 in India, and 65 more in Pakistan, with the final toll expected to be much higher.

Severity and significance
The heat wave broke records for temperature highs in Pakistan and India. The wave has also received attention due to its length.

Impacts

Impact on agriculture 
During the 2022 food crises, India began taking steps to export more rice and wheat, in part to fill the gaps created by the Russian invasion of Ukraine. However, the heatwave caused increasing local prices and lower supply, issues also exacerbated by the war increasing fertilizer prices. The heat wave occurred mostly during the final weeks of the wheat growing season, killing the plants shortly before harvest.

The heatwave strongly impacted agriculture in India. At the same time early rainfall in India was 71% lower than the norm. In Punjab, the main crop producer in India, 15% of the harvest was lost and in some regions even 30%. 
The heatwave caused a reverse in policy by Indian government, from trying to import to address the crises, to halting exports.

The heatwave has also severely impacted peach and apple harvests in Balochistan.

Nature and the environment 
The heatwave has resulted in birds falling from the sky in Gujarat.

Bridge collapse
The Hassanabad Bridge in Hunza Valley, Pakistan collapsed after a glacial lake released large amounts of water into a stream caused by the heatwave.

Electricity shortages 

India faced its worst electricity shortage in more than six years, and demand due to the heat wave strained the electric grid in the country. Scorching temperatures forced early closures of schools and sent people indoors. Rajasthan, Gujarat, and Andhra Pradesh all reduced power allocated to industry due to an increase in power consumption dedicated to cooling.

The high power demand increased demand for coal in India, which is the main source of electricity generation in the country. The state-run enterprise Coal India increased its output by 27%. Indian Railways had to cancel hundreds of passenger trains as an emergency measure to prioritize hauling coal to coal power plants to avoid blackouts. The state also requested that electricity providers imported some 19 million tonnes of coal before the end of June.

On Friday, 29 April 2022, demand for electricity reached 207 gigawatts, an all-time high in India, representing an increase of two gigawatts of demand over the previous day.

Causes

A real-time extreme event attribution study by the World Weather Attribution project shows the heat wave was rendered 30 times more likely and more intense due to climate change.

Extreme event attribution study of a 2010 heatwave show that this heatwave is consistent with underlying climate change in Pakistan and in India, and Indian scientists say that the major local cause was "weak western disturbances – storms originating in the Mediterranean region – which meant little pre-monsoon rainfall in north-western and central India".

See also
Heat waves of 2022
2022 South Asian floods

References

Heat wave
Heat wave
2022 heat waves
2022
2022
March 2022 events in India
March 2022 events in Pakistan
April 2022 events in India
April 2022 events in Pakistan
May 2022 events in India
May 2022 events in Pakistan
June 2022 events in India
June 2022 events in Pakistan
Climate change in India
Climate change in Pakistan